Deh-e Gajun (also Romanized as Deh-e Gajūn) is a village in Sarduiyeh Rural District, Sarduiyeh District, Jiroft County, Kerman Province, Iran. At the 2006 census, its population was 23, in 6 families.

References 

Populated places in Jiroft County